Lipie may refer to the following places:
Lipie, Kuyavian-Pomeranian Voivodeship (north-central Poland)
Lipie, Kutno County in Łódź Voivodeship (central Poland)
Lipie, Wałcz County in West Pomeranian Voivodeship (north-west Poland)
Lipie, Pajęczno County in Łódź Voivodeship (central Poland)
Lipie, Radomsko County in Łódź Voivodeship (central Poland)
Lipie, Tomaszów Mazowiecki County in Łódź Voivodeship (central Poland)
Lipie, Wieluń County in Łódź Voivodeship (central Poland)
Lipie, Lesser Poland Voivodeship (south Poland)
Lipie, Lubaczów County in Subcarpathian Voivodeship (south-east Poland)
Lipie, Rzeszów County in Subcarpathian Voivodeship (south-east Poland)
Lipie, Starachowice County in Świętokrzyskie Voivodeship (south-central Poland)
Lipie, Włoszczowa County in Świętokrzyskie Voivodeship (south-central Poland)
Lipie, Bieszczady County in Subcarpathian Voivodeship (south-east Poland)
Lipie, Masovian Voivodeship (east-central Poland)
Lipie, Gostyń County in Greater Poland Voivodeship (west-central Poland)
Lipie, Kępno County in Greater Poland Voivodeship (west-central Poland)
Lipie, Września County in Greater Poland Voivodeship (west-central Poland)
Lipie, Częstochowa County in Silesian Voivodeship (south Poland)
Lipie, Kłobuck County in Silesian Voivodeship (south Poland)
Lipie, Myślibórz County in West Pomeranian Voivodeship (north-west Poland)
Lipie, Świdwin County in West Pomeranian Voivodeship (north-west Poland)

and to:
 Lipie (bread), a Romanian bread